Akontio (before 1928: Τέρστικα - Terstika;) is a village in Kastoria Regional Unit, Macedonia, Greece.

The Greek census (1920) recorded 144 people in the village and in 1923 there were 115 inhabitants (or 18 families) who were Muslim. Following the Greek-Turkish population exchange, in 1926 within Terstika there were 12 refugee families from Pontus. The Greek census (1928) recorded 40 village inhabitants. There were 11 refugee families (40 people) in 1928.

References

Populated places in Kastoria (regional unit)